Hope Island State Park - Mason is a Washington state park in Mason County that is accessible only by boat. It is located due east of Steamboat Island near the Totten Inlet.

Park activities include picnicking, camping, hiking, fishing, clamming, beachcombing, and birdwatching. The park has been administered as a satellite of Jarrell Cove State Park, since acquisition from private owners of the island in 1990. Water is not available on the island, and open fires and pets are not permitted.

References

External links

State parks of Washington (state)
Parks in Mason County, Washington
1990 establishments in Washington (state)